The 1970–71 NCAA University Division men's basketball rankings was made up of two human polls, the AP Poll and the Coaches Poll, in addition to various other preseason polls.

Legend

AP Poll

Coaches Poll

References 

Rankings
College men's basketball rankings in the United States